The Burning Shore is a novel by Wilbur Smith set during and after World War I.

Smith called the book his "Road to Damascus" moment because it was the first time he used a female as a major character. It is one of the Courtney Novels.

Plot
In 1917 during World War I, South African fighter pilot Michael Courtney falls in love with Centaine, a French woman. On their wedding day – prior to their wedding – Courtney is killed in action, and, following the destruction of her home by a German bombardment, the pregnant Centaine enrols as a nurse and embarks on a hospital ship for South Africa. The ship is torpedoed by a German U-Boat and Centaine lands on the Skeleton Coast. She attempts to make her way south to South Africa but is adopted by two San who teach her how to survive in the desert.

Background
Smith later recalled "The women in some of my books are more powerful than the male characters, and that one was the breakthrough novel, because the female lead kicked the arse of all the males in the book... I was involved at the time with a very kick-arse woman [second wife Danielle Thomas] and she was fascinating, and I adapted her into the story."

1991 film adaptation
The book was adapted into a film in 1991 called Mountain of Diamonds or The Burning Shore. It was directed by Jeannot Szwarc. According to Filmink the project "stunk of MIPCOM (Jeannot Swarcz! Valerie Perrine! Jason Connery! Ernest Borgnine!)".

Cast
Isabelle Gélinas as Centaine
Derek de Lint as Lothar de la Rey
Jason Connery as Michael Courteney
John Savage as Blaine
Jean-Pierre Cassel as Louis de Thiry
Marina Vlady as Anna
Ernest Borgnine as Ernie
Frank Finlay as Garrick

References

External links

Novels by Wilbur Smith
1985 British novels
Heinemann (publisher) books
Novels set during World War I